Several settlements have been named Coalgate:

 Commerce, Alberta, Canada, originally named Coalgate
 Coalgate, New Zealand
 Coalgate, Oklahoma, USA
 Coalgate, West Virginia, USA

Coalgate may also refer to:
 Indian coal mining controversy, a corruption scandal

See also
 Colgate (disambiguation)